A list of films produced by the Marathi language film industry based in Maharashtra in the year 1992.

1992 Releases
A list of Marathi films released in 1992.

References

Lists of 1992 films by country or language
 Marathi
1992